Joyce Anne Barr (born 1951) American diplomat and a career foreign service officer in the Department of State. She served as an Assistant Secretary of State for Administration and Chief Freedom of Information Act Officer.  Prior to that, Barr was the International Affairs Advisor
at the Industrial College of the Armed Forces.
Her previous assignment was as the Executive Director for East Asian and Pacific Affairs (EAP) within the State Department. She served as the ambassador to Namibia from 2004 to 2007.

Early life 
Barr was born in 1951, in Tacoma, Washington.

Education
Barr received a B.A. in Business Administration from Pacific Lutheran University,
graduating magna cum laude. She also received a M.P.A. from Harvard University and an M.S. in National Resource Strategy from the Industrial College of the Armed Forces.

Career
Barr served as a career diplomat, having joined the Department of State in 1979. She has held assignments in Stockholm (1980), Budapest (1982), Nairobi (1985), Khartoum (1989), Ashgabat (1998), and Kuala Lumpur, where she was Counselor for Management Affairs.

Barr has also had domestic assignments in Washington, D.C, where she worked for the Department of State's Bureau of Personnel, Bureau of Human Rights and Humanitarian Affairs, and the Bureau of International Organizations in the UN Industrial Development Organization and the World Tourism Organization.

Barr was nominated as U.S. Ambassador to Namibia by President Bush and was confirmed by the U.S. Senate. Ambassador Barr began her appointment on October 4, 2004.

Barr has also participated in the Department of State Domestic Assignment Program, also known as the Pearson Program. This program was begun in the 1970s, where Foreign Service officers are assigned outside the department in order to develop their knowledge of foreign affairs legislation and of public concerns. As part of this assignment, she worked with Senator Daniel Patrick Moynihan and Congressman Bennie Thompson.

On December 17, 2011, the United States Senate confirmed Barr to be Assistant Secretary of State for Administration.

On January 26, 2017, when Rex Tillerson, Donald Trump's nominee for United States Secretary of State, visited the United States State Department, Barr, Patrick F. Kennedy, Michele Bond, and Gentry O. Smith were all simultaneously asked to resign from the department.

Barr is a Fellow of the National Academy of Public Administration.

References

External links

|-

1951 births
African-American diplomats
Ambassadors of the United States to Namibia
American women ambassadors
Harvard Kennedy School alumni
Living people
Pacific Lutheran University alumni
American expatriates in Kenya
United States Assistant Secretaries of State
United States Foreign Service personnel
Politicians from Tacoma, Washington
21st-century African-American people
21st-century African-American women
21st-century American diplomats
20th-century African-American people
20th-century African-American women